The 1963 Northern Illinois Huskies football team was an American football team that represented Northern Illinois University in the Interstate Intercollegiate Athletic Conference (IIAC) during the 1963 NCAA College Division football season. In their eighth year under head coach Howard Fletcher, the Huskies compiled a perfect 10–0 record, won the IIAC championship, and outscored opponents by a total of 337 to 97. They appeared ithe Mineral Water Bowl, defeating . The team was recognized by the Associated Press as the 1963 small college national champion. However, the United Press International recognized Delaware as the small college champion. Northern Illinois played home games at the 5,500-seat Glidden Field, located on the east end of campus, in DeKalb, Illinois.

Senior quarterback George Bork broke several national passing records, including single-season records for passing yardage (3,077), passing touchdowns (32), passes attempted (374), and completions (244). He also set single-game records for passes attempted (67), completions (43), and passing touchdowns (7). He was voted the team's most valuable player for the second consecutive year.

Schedule

References

Northern Illinois
Northern Illinois Huskies football seasons
NCAA Small College Football Champions
Interstate Intercollegiate Athletic Conference football champion seasons
College football undefeated seasons
Northern Illinois Huskies football